The 2012 European Rally Championship season was the 60th season of the FIA European Rally Championship, the European continental championship series in rallying. The season consisted of eleven (twelve planned) rallies, beginning with the Internationale Jänner Rallye in Austria on 5 January 2012 and concluding with the Rallye International du Valais on 27 October 2012. After 8 rounds, Finnish driver Juho Hänninen secured the championship, winning four events.

Calendar
The calendar for the 2012 season featured twelve rallies, the eleven rallies from the previous season plus the  Internationale Jänner Rallye in Austria. Two events were shared with the Intercontinental Rally Challenge: Ypres and Zlín. However one event, the Rallye d'Antibes Côte d'Azur, withdrew from the ERC during the season.

Championship standings

Drivers' championship
For the final classification in a rally, the winner got 25 points, the runner-up 18 and the third placed driver 15. Drivers ranked 4 to 10 got 12–10–8–6–4–2–1 point(s). Additionally, the top five of every leg got 7–5–3–2–1 point(s). Drivers had to start in a minimum of 4 events in order to qualify for the final standings and at least one event in either half of the season. Only the 4 best results from both half-seasons counted towards the final standings.

Note: The "4+4" column lists the 4 best results from both halves of the season, and only if the driver competed in at least one event in each half. The "all" column lists the total number of points, but only if they differ from the other column.

External links
 Official website

References

European Rally Championship
Rally Championship
2012